Tîrnova is a commune in Dondușeni District, Moldova. It is composed of three villages: Briceva, Elenovca (formerly Elena-Doamnă) and Tîrnova.

Briceva (also Brichevo, Bricheva) was established as a Jewish agricultural colony in 1836 and maintained Jewish majority until World War II.

People

 Gary Bertini (born in Briceva)
 Boris Trakhtenbrot (born in Briceva)
 Mihail Șleahtițchi

References

External links
 Briceva in the list of Jewish agricultural colonies of Soroca District of Bessarabia

Communes of Dondușeni District
Soroksky Uyezd
Soroca County (Romania)
Historic Jewish communities